Fuglede's conjecture is a closed problem in mathematics proposed by Bent Fuglede in 1974.

Spectral sets and translational tiles 
Spectral sets in 

Translational tiles of 

Partial results 
 Fuglede proved in 1974 that the conjecture holds if  is a fundamental domain of a lattice.
 In 2003, Alex Iosevich, Nets Katz and Terence Tao proved that the conjecture holds if  is a convex planar domain.
In 2019, Nir Lev and Máté Matolcsi settled the conjecture for convex domains affirmatively in all dimensions.

References 

Conjectures